Vainionora americana is a species of crustose lichen in the family Lecanoraceae that is found in the United States. It was described as a species new to science in 2004 by lichenologists Klaus Kalb, Tor Tønsberg, and John Alan Elix. The type was collected by Tønsberg from the southern Appalachian Mountains of North Carolina, where it was found growing on the bark of a maple tree. It was later recorded in Alabama.

Vainionora americana has a crustose thallus that is greenish-gray in color, and soralia that are relatively large and convex. It produces atranorin and two xanthones as secondary metabolites.

References

Lecanoraceae
Lichen species
Lichens of the Southeastern United States
Lichens described in 2004
Taxa named by Klaus Kalb
Taxa named by John Alan Elix
Fungi without expected TNC conservation status